Eucalyptus protensa is a species of mallee that is endemic to the southwest of Western Australia. It has smooth, dark grey or brownish bark, narrow lance-shaped adult leaves, elongated flower buds in groups of seven, yellowish green flowers and hemispherical fruit.

Description
Eucalyptus protensa is a mallee, sometimes a tree, that typically grows to a height of  but does not form a lignotuber. It has smooth dark grey or brownish bark with an oily appearance. Flowering occurs from September to November and the flowers are yellowish green.

Taxonomy and naming
The specific epithet (protensa) is from the Latin protensus meaning "stretched out" or "extended", referring to the long operculum.

Distribution and habitat
This eucalypt grows on undulating plains between Norseman and Balladonia in the Fraser Range.

Conservation status
This mallee is classified as "not threatened" by the Western Australian Government Department of Parks and Wildlife,

See also
List of Eucalyptus species

References

Eucalypts of Western Australia
Trees of Australia
protensa
Myrtales of Australia
Plants described in 1991
Taxa named by Lawrence Alexander Sidney Johnson
Taxa named by Ken Hill (botanist)